The 1965 Scottish League Cup final was played on 23 October 1965 at Hampden Park in Glasgow and it was the final of the 20th Scottish League Cup competition. The final was contested by the Old Firm rivals Rangers and Celtic for a second consecutive year. Celtic gained revenge for their defeat in the previous final, as they won the match 2–1 thanks to two goals by John "Yogi" Hughes.

The attendance of 107,609 is a record for any League Cup final in the United Kingdom.

Match details

References

External links 

 Soccerbase

1965
League Cup Final
Scottish League Cup Final 1965
Scottish League Cup Final 1965
1960s in Glasgow
October 1965 sports events in the United Kingdom
Old Firm matches